This article contains information about the literary events and publications of 1946.

Events
January – The Penguin Classics imprint is launched in the U.K. under the editorship of E. V. Rieu, whose translation of the Odyssey is the first of the books published, and will be the country's best-selling book over the next decade.
January 5 – The Estonian writer Jaan Kross is arrested and imprisoned by the occupying Soviet authorities.
February – The poet Ezra Pound, brought back to the United States on treason charges, is found unfit to face trial due to insanity and sent to St. Elizabeths Hospital, Washington, D.C., where he remains for 12 years.
May 20 – The English poet W. H. Auden becomes a United States citizen.
May 22 – George Orwell leaves London to spend much of the next 18 months on the Scottish island of Jura, working on his novel Nineteen Eighty-Four (known at an earlier stage of composition as The Last Man in Europe). This year his Animal Farm becomes book of the year in the United States.
August 18 – The Assamese poet Amulya Barua is killed aged 24 in communal violence while studying at the University of Calcutta. His only collection of poems, Achina (The Stranger), is published posthumously.
October 1 – The English première of J. B. Priestley's drama An Inspector Calls (set in 1912) shows at the New Theatre, London. It stars Ralph Richardson.
October 9 – The Broadway première of Eugene O'Neill's drama The Iceman Cometh, set in 1912, is held at the Martin Beck Theatre, New York City.
October 10 – Die Chinesische Mauer by Swiss writer Max Frisch, receives its stage première. 
November 7 – Walker Percy, a U.S. writer of philosophical novels, marries Mary Bernice Townsend.
November 8 – The English novelist and diarist Christopher Isherwood becomes a U.S. citizen.
December 18
Brendan Behan is released from internment in the Republic of Ireland under an amnesty.
Damon Runyon's ashes are scattered over New York City from an airplane piloted by Eddie Rickenbacker.
December 23 – Giovannino Guareschi publishes the first story about the priest Don Camillo in his magazine Candido.
December 26 – David Lean's film of Great Expectations is released in England.
unknown dates
The publisher August Aimé Balkema produces his first book in South Africa, Vyjtig Gedigte by the poet C. Louis Leipoldt.
The American writer and theologian Frederick Buechner resumes his B.A. degree course at Princeton University after war service.

New books

Fiction
Jorge Amado – Seara Vermelha
Francis Ambrière – The Long Holiday (Les Grandes Vacances)
Miguel Ángel Asturias – El Señor Presidente
René Barjavel – The Tragic Innocents
Simone de Beauvoir – All Men are Mortal (Tous les hommes sont mortels)
Algernon Blackwood – The Doll and One Other
Jorge Luis Borges – Deutsches Requiem
Tadeusz Borowski – This Way for the Gas, Ladies and Gentlemen (or Ladies and Gentlemen, to the Gas Chamber, originally Pożegnanie z Marią (Farewell to Maria), short stories)
Phyllis Bottome – The Lifeline
 Christianna Brand – Suddenly at His Residence
Ivan Bunin – Dark Avenues («Тёмные аллеи», Tyomnyye allei, short stories, complete edition)
John Dickson Carr
He Who Whispers
My Late Wives (as by Carter Dickson)
Adolfo Bioy Casares and Silvina Ocampo – Los que aman, odian (Those Who Love, Hate)
Peter Cheyney 
 G-Man at the Yard
 Uneasy Terms
Agatha Christie – The Hollow
A. E. Coppard – Fearful Pleasures
Edmund Crispin – The Moving Toyshop
Kenneth Fearing – The Big Clock
Adonias Filho – Os servos da morte
Errol Flynn – Showdown
C. S. Forester - Lord Hornblower
Pat Frank – Mr. Adam
Carlo Emilio Gadda – That Awful Mess on Via Merulana (Quer pasticciaccio brutto de via Merulana, serial publication)
Stella Gibbons – Westwood
William Lindsay Gresham – Nightmare Alley
Ruth Guimarães – Água Funda (Deep Water, in Paraíba Valley dialect of Brazilian Portuguese)
João Guimarães Rosa – Sagarana
Thomas Heggen – Mister Roberts
Raymond J. Healy and J. Francis McComas, editors – Adventures in Time and Space
George Wylie Henderson – Jule
William Hope Hodgson – The House on the Borderland and Other Novels
Robert E. Howard – Skull-Face and Others
 Michael Innes 
 From London Far
 What Happened at Hazelwood
Christopher Isherwood – The Berlin Stories
Cläre Jung – Aus der Tiefe rufe ich
Nikos Kazantzakis – Zorba the Greek (Βίος και Πολιτεία του Αλέξη Ζορμπά, Life and Times of Alexis Zorbas)
Arthur Koestler – Thieves in the Night
Philip Larkin – Jill
Violette Leduc – L'Asphyxie (translated as In the Prison of Her Skin)
Lois Lenski – Strawberry Girl
Eric Linklater – Private Angelo
Frank Belknap Long – The Hounds of Tindalos
E. C. R. Lorac – Fire in the Thatch
W. Somerset Maugham – Then and Now
Carson McCullers – Member of the Wedding
Oscar Micheaux – The Story of Dorothy Stanfield
A.A. Milne – Chloe Marr
Gladys Mitchell  – Here Comes a Chopper
Mervyn Peake – Titus Groan (first of the Gormenghast series)
Ann Petry – The Street
Isaac Rosenfeld – Passage from Home
Anya Seton – The Turquoise
Margit Söderholm – All the World's Delights
Rex Stout – The Silent Speaker
 Cecil Street 
 Death in Harley Street
 The Lake House
 Situation Vacant
Tugelbay Sydykbekov – Bizdin zamandyn kišileri (People of our time)
Phoebe Atwood Taylor
The Asey Mayo Trio
Punch with Care
 Ruthven Todd 
 Bodies in a Bookshop
 The Death Cap
 Death for Madame
 Swing Low, Swing Death
Gore Vidal – Williwaw
A. E. van Vogt – Slan
Boris Vian
I Spit on Your Graves (J'irai cracher sur vos tombes, as Vernon Sullivan)
Vercoquin and the Plankton (Vercoquin et le plancton)
H. Russell Wakefield – The Clock Strikes Twelve
Mervyn Wall – The Unfortunate Fursey
Robert Penn Warren – All the King's Men
Eudora Welty – Delta Wedding
Henry S. Whitehead – West India Lights
Kiichirō Yamate – Momotarō-zamurai (桃太郎侍)
Ivan Yefremov – The Land of Foam («На краю Ойкумены», At the edge of infinity)
Seishi Yokomizo – The Honjin Murders (本陣殺人事件, Honjin satsujin jiken)

Children and young people
Rev. W. Awdry – Thomas the Tank Engine (second in The Railway Series of 42 books by him and his son Christopher Awdry)
Carolyn Sherwin Bailey – Miss Hickory
Nancy Barnes – Wonderful Year
Enid Blyton – First Term at Malory Towers (first in the Malory Towers series of 6 books)
Godfried Bomans
De Avonturen van Pa Pinkelman (The Adventures of Pa Pinkelman)
Sprookjes (The Wily Wizard and the Wicked Witch and other weird stories)
Jan Brzechwa – Academy of Mr. Kleks (Akademia Pana Kleksa, 1946)
Gertrude Crampton – Scuffy the Tugboat
Ernest Elmore – Snuffly Snorty Dog
William Glynne-Jones – Brecon Adventure
Elizabeth Goudge – The Little White Horse
Graham Greene – The Little Train
Racey Helps – Footprints in the Snow
Tove Jansson – Comet in Moominland (Kometjakten / Mumintrollet på kometjakt / Kometen kommer)
Madeleine L'Engle – Ilsa
Astrid Lindgren – Pippi Goes on Board
Sheila Stuart – Alison's Highland Holiday (first in the Alison series of 15 books)
Charles Tazewell – The Littlest Angel
Ivy Wallace – Pookie (first in the Pookie series of ten books)
T. H. White – Mistress Masham's Repose

Drama
Arthur Adamov – L'Aveu (The Confession)
Clifford Bax – Golden Eagle
S. N. Behrman – Jane
Ugo Betti – Delitto all'isola delle capre (Crime on Goat Island)
Jean Cocteau – L'Aigle à deux têtes
Constance Cox – Vanity Fair
Eduardo De Filippo
Filumena Marturano
Questi fantasmi (All these ghosts)
Eynon Evans – Wishing Well
Christopher Fry – A Phoenix Too Frequent (verse)
Kenneth Horne – Fools Rush In
Frederick Lonsdale – But for the Grace of God
Ewan MacColl – Uranium 235
Donagh MacDonagh – Happy as Larry
Robert McLeish – The Gorbals Story
Louis MacNeice – The Dark Tower (radio play)
Bernard Miles – Let Tyrants Tremble!
Ronald Millar – Frieda
Henry de Montherlant – Malatesta
Eugene O'Neill – The Iceman Cometh
J. B. Priestley – Ever Since Paradise
Terence Rattigan – The Winslow Boy
Nelson Rodrigues – Álbum de família
Carl Zuckmayer – Des Teufels General (The Devil's General)

Poetry
Elizabeth Bishop – North & South
Josef Čapek – Básně z koncentračního tabora (Poems from a Concentration Camp; published posthumously)
William Carlos Williams – Paterson, Book One

Non-fiction
Erich Auerbach – Mimesis: The Representation of Reality in Western Literature (Mimesis: Dargestellte Wirklichkeit in der abendländischen Literatur)
Marc Bloch (died 1944) – L'Étrange défaite: Témoignage écrit en 1940 (Strange Defeat: a Statement of Evidence Written in 1940)
Cleanth Brooks – The Well Wrought Urn: Studies in the Structure of Poetry
R. G. Collingwood (died 1943) – The Idea of History (collected lectures)
John Stewart Collis – While Following the Plough
Viktor Frankl – ...trotzdem Ja zum Leben sagen: Ein Psychologe erlebt das Konzentrationslager (...nevertheless Say 'Yes' to Life: A Psychologist Experiences the Concentration Camp, translated as Man's Search for Meaning)
Jean Genet – Miracle de la rose
John Hersey – Hiroshima
Jens Müller – Tre kom tilbake (Three Came Back)
George Orwell – Critical Essays
Jean-Paul Sartre – Existentialism and Humanism (L'Existentialisme est un humanisme)
Benjamin Spock – The Common Sense Book of Baby and Child Care
Władysław Szpilman (as told to Jerzy Waldorff) – Śmierć miasta ("Death of a City", later translated as The Pianist)
Paramahansa Yogananda – Autobiography of a Yogi

Births
January 4 – Lisa Appignanesi, Polish-born author and academic
January 21 – Gretel Ehrlich, American travel writer, poet and essayist
February 7 – Brian Patten, English poet
February 25 – Franz Xaver Kroetz, German dramatist
March 1 – Jim Crace, English author
March 5 – Mem Fox (Merrion Frances Partridge), Australian children's writer
April 2 – Sue Townsend, English comic novelist and playwright (died 2014)
April 29 – Humphrey Carpenter, English biographer, children's fiction writer and radio broadcaster (died 2005)
May 8 – Ruth Padel, English poet and author
May 11 – Valerie Grove, English journalist and author
May 12 – L. Neil Smith, American author and activist
June 28 – John Birtwhistle, English poet and librettist
July 22 – Ryoki Inoue, born José Carlos Ryoki de Alpoim Inoue, prolific Brazilian novelist
July 26 – Joel Mokyr, Israeli economic historian
July 28 – Fahmida Riaz, Pakistani writer
August 1 – Paul Torday, English novelist (died 2013)
August 2 – James Howe, American journalist and author of juvenile fiction
August 29 – Leona Gom, Canadian poet and novelist
September 12 – Neil Lyndon, English journalist and author of No More Sex War: The Failures of Feminism
September 26 – Andrea Dworkin, American writer and activist (died 2005)
October 1 – Tim O'Brien, American novelist
October 4 - Susan Sarandon American actress
October 19 - Philip Pullman, English author
October 20 – Elfriede Jelinek, Austrian novelist and Nobel laureate
October 28 – Sharon Thesen, Canadian poet
November 7 – Diane Francis, Canadian journalist and author
November 18 – Alan Dean Foster, American science fiction author
December 2 – Ibrahim Abdel Meguid, Egyptian novelist
December 4 – Maria Antònia Oliver Cabrer, Majorca-born Spanish Catalan fiction writer
December 11 – Ellen Meloy, American nature writer (died 2004)

Uncertain date
Sarah Harrison, English novelist and children's writer

Deaths
January 6 – Dion Fortune, British occultist, Christian Qabalist, ceremonial magician and novelist (born 1890)
February 11 – John Langalibalele Dube, South African Zulu writer (born 1871)
March 19 – Catherine Carswell, Scottish novelist and biographer (born 1879)
March 20 – Henry Handel Richardson (Ethel Florence Lindesay Richardson), Australian novelist (born 1870)
April 1 – Edward Sheldon, American dramatist (born 1886)
April 11 – Dem. Theodorescu, Romanian novelist and journalist (born 1888)
May 19 – Booth Tarkington, American novelist and dramatist (born 1869)
May 20 – Jane Findlater, Scottish novelist (born 1866)
May 25 – Ernest Rhys, English writer and book series editor of Welsh extraction (born 1859)
Summer – Ștefan Foriș, Hungarian and Romanian journalist and communist activist (murdered, born 1892)
June 6 – Gerhart Hauptmann, German dramatist, novelist and poet, winner of the Nobel Prize in Literature (born 1862)
July 8 – Orrick Glenday Johns, American poet and playwright (born 1887)
July 22 – Edward Sperling, Russian-born American humorist (killed by bomb, born 1889)
July 27 – Gertrude Stein, American novelist, poet and dramatist (born 1874)
July 30 – Nikolai Alexandrovich Morozov, Russian poet and revolutionary (born 1854)
August 13 – H. G. Wells, English novelist (born 1866)
August 18 – Marion Angus, Scottish poet (born 1865)
August 31 – Harley Granville-Barker, English actor, dramatist and critic (born 1877)
September 9 – Violet Jacob, Scottish historical novelist and poet (born 1863)
September 21 – Lydia J. Newcomb Comings, American author, educator, lecturer (born 1850)
September 26 – William Strunk, Jr., American professor of English (born 1869)
November 5 – Thomas Scott-Ellis, 8th Baron Howard de Walden, English author and patron of the arts(born 1880)
November 14 – May Sinclair, English novelist (born 1863)
December 10 – Damon Runyon, American short-story writer (born 1880)
December 17 – Constance Garnett, English translator (born 1861)
December 23 – Ellen Marriage, English translator (born 1865)

Awards
Carnegie Medal for children's literature: Elizabeth Goudge, The Little White Horse
James Tait Black Memorial Prize for fiction: Oliver Onions, Poor Man's Tapestry
James Tait Black Memorial Prize for biography: Richard Aldington, Wellington
Newbery Medal for children's literature: Lois Lenski, Strawberry Girl
Nobel Prize for literature: Hermann Hesse
Premio Nadal: José María Gironella, Un hombre
Prix Goncourt: Jean-Jacques Gautier, Histoire d'un fait divers
Pulitzer Prize for Drama: Russel Crouse, Howard Lindsay, State of the Union
Pulitzer Prize for Poetry: no award given
Pulitzer Prize for the Novel: no award given

References

 
Years of the 20th century in literature